Animal roleplay is a form of roleplay where at least one participant plays the part of a non-human animal. As with most forms of roleplay, its uses include play and psychodrama.

Animal roleplay may also be found in BDSM contexts, where an individual may take part in a dominant/submissive relationship by being treated as an animal. The activity is often referred to as petplay. However, not all types of animal roleplay within BDSM are petplay and not all petplay in BDSM involves roleplaying as an animal; some can be referred to as primal play and is not related to the furry fandom.

Overview

The origins of animal roleplay and petplay are probably various and diverse, again depending upon the participants involved.  However, its origins are certainly influenced by costuming, fiction, myth and legend, roleplay and psychodrama in their various aspects. Some of the earliest published images of animal play (especially pony play) are to be found in the work of John Willie, primarily in Bizarre magazine published from 1946 to 1959.

Some of the equipment that can be used in animal roleplay include leash, chain, bit gag, neck collar, bondage harness, catsuit, bodystocking, butt plug, muzzle, ballet boots, etc.

Cultural and ritual use

Non-sexual animal roleplay was a common and integral part of ritual in many tribal cultures both in recent and likely prehistoric times, where a member (or members) of the tribe would take the role physically and often spiritually of an animal that was either revered or hunted. Examples of the former include many of the American Indian tribes and Arctic native peoples. Examples of the latter are evidenced by cave paintings. In 1911, Julia Tuell photographed the last Animal Dance ("Massaum") performed by the Northern Cheyenne of Montana.

It is also sometimes used in education, especially physical education, as a way to encourage people to exercise the body in unusual ways, by mimicking various animals.

Other forms

Some superheroes, heroines, and villains also feature elements related to pet play; such as DC Comics's Wildcat, Catwoman, the Penguin and Vixen, Marvel's Tigra, Man-Wolf and Black Cat, or even Nastassja Kinski's Irena Gallier in the 1982 film Cat People (a remake of the 1942 Simone Simon film), and Miss Kitty from the Brendan Fraser movie Monkeybone.  All involve animal qualities taken on by a human.  Some would even count the enactment or spiritual belief in therianthropy (werewolves, werecats, etc.) as falling under human animal roleplay or transformation play as well.

Peter Shaffer's 1973 play Equus tells the story of a young man who has a pathological religious fascination with horses, but this appears closer to zoophilia than pet play. Andrew Lloyd Webber's 1981 musical Cats traces a tribe of urban cats, and in 2007 War Horse used full size puppets to play horses on stage.

Erotic scenarios

Like much of erotic play and roleplay, animal roleplay in an erotic or relational context is entirely defined by the people involved and by their mood and interests at the time of play. It ranges from the simple imitation of a vocal "whinnying" of a horse to the barking, panting or playful nudging of a puppy, or playful behaviour of a kitten, to crawling around on all fours and being fed, or petted, by hand. To the greater extremes of dressing up as a pony in modified horse tack, masks, prosthetics and temporary bondage based body modification (such as binding the forearms to the upperarms and/or the calves to the thighs).

Public participation in human animal roleplay is varied. A couple could inconspicuously role-play a pet play scene in public, which would look to the casual observer like one partner is merely stroking the other's neck. In the case of some BDSM fetishists, one partner may wear a dog collar with a leash attached.

The reasons for playing such a character or animal can vary as much as the physical manifestations and intensity of the play.  Some people enjoy being able to "cut loose" into a different, or more dynamic personality (see other variations).  In some cases, pet play is seen as a loving, quiet cuddling time where there is no need for verbalizations and the simple act of stroking, rubbing and holding the other partner is satisfying or reassuring in and of itself for those involved.  For others, there may be a spiritual side to it.  Some feel closer to their animal totem, while others may identify with something akin to a deeper side or part of their own psyche (known as therianthropy).  For still others, there is the experience of power exchange setup in a context or structure which they can accept.

Some cases could be considered a type of animal transformation fantasy. They can have strong elements of exhibitionism, be totally enjoyed in the privacy of the home, or lie somewhere between either boundary. While not widespread, erotic human-animal roleplay is still enjoyed by a sizable number of people. However, it is still primarily identified with BDSM practice. Though commonly misinterpreted as being associated with furry or other alternative lifestyle activities, that is generally not the case though some instances may exist.

For most participants, it has no connection whatsoever with bestiality, which is controversial and would usually be considered edgeplay in BDSM circles.

Other considerations

Each type of play can focus on a certain "strength" of an animal character.  Pony play often involves the practice and training that a horse owner or trainer would put their horse through to learn how to walk, canter, etc., as modified for human limbs.  Puppy and kitten play often can involve BDSM related discipline.  Cow Play often involves fantasies of lactation and impregnation.  The usual limits of safe, sane and consensual apply to roleplay as much as any other activity between humans who accept and respect their partner's interests and limits. For most, this does not include bestiality.

Note: Just because one partner is playing the "pet" does not necessarily make them the passive or submissive play partner in the scene.

BDSM scenarios
Some people believe that they have certain animal 'instincts' and that they can let them out through animal roleplay. This is especially true in the BDSM communities, where some people 'live' as their chosen animal 24/7. This type of mentality goes beyond roleplay and becomes a full lifestyle for the parties involved. There are also 'hybrids'. These are humans who live part-time as one type of animal, and part-time as another. This is usually determined by the situation.

In the BDSM scene, people engage in animal roleplay to build stronger emotional connections. People develop deep emotional connections with their pets. Petplay, especially pup and kitten play seeks to create the same deep emotional connection between the owner/master and submissive/pet. The dom may demand unconditional love and obedience, but they may also train their pet to be more emotionally perceptive and empathic. This helps the sub feel safe and secure in the relationship.

Pony play

Pony play is where at least one of the participants dresses to resemble and assumes the mannerisms and character of an equine animal. People involved in pony-play ("ponies") generally divide themselves to three groups although some will participate in more than one category:

Cart ponies pull a sulky with their owner.
Riding ponies are ridden, either on all fours or on two legs, with the "rider" on the shoulders of the "pony" (also known as Shoulder riding). Note that a human back is generally not strong enough to take the weight of another adult without risk of injury, so four-legged "riding" is generally symbolic, with the "rider" taking most of their weight on their own legs.
Show ponies show off their dressage skills and often wear elaborate harnesses, plumes and so on.

A documentary film Pony Passion was produced by British pony play club De Ferre in 2003 showing their club's activities and the 2005 documentary film, Born in a Barn, depicted the lives of several pony-play enthusiasts.

Pony play is sometimes referred to as "The Aristotelian Perversion", in reference to an apocryphal story where the philosopher Aristotle was persuaded to let a woman named Phyllis ride him like a horse, in promised exchange for sexual favors: an episode depicted in various woodcuts and other works of art. For more info on this story see Phyllis and Aristotle

Puppy play

According to Men's Health, puppy play is "is a form of consensual, adult role-play popular in the gay leather community, where people dress up and embody the characteristics of a dog".  One should note that this does not mean puppy play is only popular in that community or only exists there.

In puppy play, or pup play, at least one of the participants acts out canine mannerisms and behaviors, which is sometimes associated with leather culture. If there is a dominant role it can be  taken by a "handler", "trainer", "master", or in the case of someone who also identifies as a pup, an "alpha". Not all "pups" or "dogs" are "alpha", some consider themselves "beta" or "omega", and as in the canine world hierarchy, "beta" can refer to someone who has both dominant and submissive or service oriented tendencies depending on the situation where "omega" generally indicates a more submissive, passive, service oriented and playful nature. Unlike other forms of animal roleplay, it is not uncommon for two or more pups to play together as equals, possibly fight for dominance, or play where one is clearly the "alpha".

Puppy play is often about being playful, mischievous, cheeky and instinctive. Many human puppies like to simplify their desires and motivations as they embrace the side of themselves that acts solely on instinct. 
A great deal of animal role play occurs socially. A group of like-minded pet-players will gather at events specifically organised for social pet play. At pup play events, for example, which occur all over the world, human puppies will act like bio puppies, relaxing, playing fetch, and interacting with human handlers.

In relation to other BDSM play, a "puppy" who is "unowned" or "uncollared" can be referred to as a "stray". Many pups use a headspace when getting into a roleplay scenario known as "pup space" which allows them to take on their puppy persona more easily. Other elements rooted in BDSM play involve bondage and restriction with collars, leashes, kneepads (for knee protection), harnesses, rubber suits, hoods (not needed but sometimes helps to assist with headspace and self identity) and mitts (for hand protection as well as finger usage restriction). Both sexual and non-sexual services are options that occur in the scene and should be discussed by the participants (pup / handler, beta / alpha, etc.) ahead of time so expectations are not misinterpreted. "Training" may take place in order to teach commands or tricks if both participants desire such interactions.

Groups involved in puppy play include Pup Pride Australia, which since 2015 has participated in the Sydney Gay and Lesbian Mardi Gras and has featured in an Australian TV documentary aired by the Special Broadcasting Service.

Kitten play

In kitten play, a person dresses to resemble and assumes the mannerisms and character of a kitten or cat, a characteristic of which is that it keeps some independence and, as part of the fantasy, might retaliate against the partner trying to tame/train them. Some might be trained to do tricks such as bring toys back, to beg, or go on walks. Like in puppy play, a "kitten" or "cat" that is unowned or uncollared may be called a "stray".

See also

 Animal transformation fantasy (disambiguation)
 Cat Girl Manor
 Consent (BDSM)
 Erotic humiliation
 Fur fetishism
 Furry fandom
 Human furniture
 Master slave relationship
 Animal roleplay in ancient Rome
 Sexual roleplay
 Zoophilia

References

External links

Dog play entry in the BDSM Dictionary
An Introduction to Pet Play

Human sexuality
Sexual fetishism
Sexual roleplay
Sexology
Sexual attraction